Tavistock Hundred was the name of one of thirty two ancient administrative units of Devon, England.

The parishes in the hundred were:
Brentor,
Milton Abbot and
Tavistock

See also 
 List of hundreds of England and Wales - Devon

References 

Hundreds of Devon